Aphileta misera is a species of dwarf spider in the family Linyphiidae. It is found in North America, Europe, and Russia (Siberia to Far East).

References

 Bradley, Richard A. (2012). Common Spiders of North America. University of California Press.
 Ubick, Darrell (2005). Spiders of North America: An Identification Manual. American Arachnological Society.

External links

 NCBI Taxonomy Browser, Aphileta misera

Linyphiidae
Spiders described in 1882